Salvin's salamander (Bolitoglossa salvinii) is a species of salamander in the family Plethodontidae.
It is found in El Salvador and Guatemala.
Its natural habitats are subtropical or tropical moist lowland forests, subtropical or tropical moist montane forests, pastureland, plantations, and heavily degraded former forest.
It is threatened by habitat loss.

References

Bolitoglossa
Amphibians described in 1868
Taxonomy articles created by Polbot